Kungak (Köngäk) is a rural locality (a village) and the administrative center of Kungakovsky Selsoviet, Askinsky District, Bashkortostan, Russia. The population was 602 as of 2010. There are 6 streets.

Geography 
Kungak is located 57 km northeast of Askino (the district's administrative centre) by road. Klyuchevoy Log is the nearest rural locality.

References 

Rural localities in Askinsky District